Melissa C. Schwen Ryan (born July 17, 1972, in Bloomington, Indiana) is an American rower. After her first medal in the 1996 Atlanta Olympics, she donated a kidney to her sick brother in need of a transplant. She became the first Olympian to medal and have donated a kidney. On March 20, 2010, she was inducted into the National Rowing Hall of Fame. Schwen-Ryan, her husband, Tim, and their three children Keith, Bach, and Hugh moved from their home in Dallas, Texas, to Jackson, Wyoming, and then Santa Barbara, California. They are currently living in the Bay Area.

References 

 
 

1972 births
Living people
American female rowers
Georgetown Hoyas rowers
Sportspeople from Bloomington, Indiana
Rowers at the 1996 Summer Olympics
Rowers at the 2000 Summer Olympics
Olympic bronze medalists for the United States in rowing
Olympic silver medalists for the United States in rowing
World Rowing Championships medalists for the United States
Medalists at the 2000 Summer Olympics
Medalists at the 1996 Summer Olympics
Organ transplant donors
21st-century American women
Pan American Games medalists in rowing
Pan American Games silver medalists for the United States
Medalists at the 1999 Pan American Games
Rowers at the 1999 Pan American Games